Lakmos is a mountain in eastern Ioannina and western Trikala regional units. The mountain is a part of the Pindus mountain range. Its highest peak is the Peristeri, at 2,295 m elevation. The nearest mountains are the Athamanika to the south, the Lygkos to the north and the Mitsikeli to the west. It is drained by the river Arachthos and its tributaries to the north, west and south, and by the Acheloos to the east.

The nearest town is Metsovo, at its northeastern end. Other places in the mountains are Anthousa in the southeast, Anthochori in the north, Megali Gotista in the west and Vathypedo in the southwest. The Egnatia Odos motorway (Igoumenitsa - Ioannina - Kozani - Thessaloniki - Alexandroupoli) passes north of the mountains.

References

External links
  Greek Mountain Flora
 Lakmos on GTP Travel Pages

Landforms of Ioannina (regional unit)
Landforms of Trikala (regional unit)
Two-thousanders of Greece
Mountains of Epirus (region)
Mountains of Thessaly
Pindus